Avtotor is an automobile manufacturing company located in Kaliningrad Oblast, Russia. Avtotor was established in 1996. By 2008, it was one of the largest producers and assemblers of cars in the world. Industry publication Automotive Manufacturing Solutions estimates the company's revenue for 2011 at 4 billion euros and total employees at 3,500, although credit rating agency Expert estimated total revenue in 2017 at $689 million.

History 
Avtotor was founded in 1996 by a group of investors, led by current majority owner and chairman of the board of directors, Vladimir Scherbakov, former Deputy Prime Minister of the USSR and Chairman of the State Committee for Labour and Social Problems.

With an investment of $130,000,000, an assembly plant was installed in an unoccupied shipyard in Kaliningrad, with an original plan to produce Nissan automobiles. The name of the company is a portmanteau of "auto" and the German word "tor", meaning "gate". In 1997, the new plant also began assembling Kia automobiles.

In the aftermath of the 1998 Russian financial crisis and the ensuing drop in automobile sales, the company found itself in a difficult financial position. To mitigate the consequences of the crisis, the company changed its business model. The company secured a contract with BMW to become a licensed importer for the German automaker. Later, the company began a partnership with General Motors, starting full-scale assembly on the Chevrolet Lacetti.

Cooperations

Hyundai Motor Company 
In September 2012, the company began the production of the commercial vehicle Hyundai HD-78, with a capacity up to 3.5 tonnes, and in 2013, of the trucks Hyundai HD-170 and HD-120. In March 2013, the company started the assembly of the Hyundai i40 sedan and coupe, and in July 2013, of the brand's flagship, the Hyundai Equus. In October 2015, the Hyundai Elantra was added to the line-up.

Kia Motors 
Kia was the initial licensor for Avtotor's manufacturing, and the plant has produced more than 240,000 vehicles for Kia.

Among the models produced at the Avtotor plant are the Clarus, Rocsta, Avella, Besta, Pregio, Carnival I, Carnival II, Carnival IV, Rio I, Rio II, Opirus I, Opirus II, Magentis I, Magentis II, Carens I, Carens II, Sportage I, Sportage II, Sportage III, Ceed, Soul, and Mohave.

In February 2016, Avtotor started production on the Kia Optima.

NAC 
In June 2005, Avtovar collaborated with NAVECO,  part of the Nanjing Automobile Corporation, to produce Avtotor-Trucks starting with the Yuejin line up, a broad range of low-bed delivery trucks with a payload of 0.8 tonnes to 24 tonnes.

Former cooperations

BMW 

Production of BMW vehicles began in August 1999 with the BMW 5 Series (E39) and 7 Series. In the first year, Avtotor produced 555 cars. In March 2001, the factory began producing the BMW 3 Series (E46), and later, the new 5 Series (E60).

In July 2009, Avtotor increased the capacity of the plant and began production of the crossovers BMW X5 and X6. At the end of May 2010, the company announced the start of assembly on the new BMW 5 Series (F10) for the Russian market from kits received from Germany.

The BMW line-up produced in Kaliningrad has expanded over time with the following models: E65/66 (7 Series), F01/F02 (7 Series), E90 (3 Series), E70 (X5), E71 (X6), E83 (X3) and E84 (X1).

In May 2015, BMW released a statement postponing the decision to invest in another plant in Russia due to economic uncertainty in the country. There have been rumors in the media about the quality of Russian made BMWs. These vehicles also did not have factory and manufacturer warranties, unlike their German-made counterparts.

Chery Automobile 
Chery car assembly in the Kaliningrad factory began in 2006. Chery car sales began in Russia in May 2006.

In the first six months of 2007, 18,558 vehicles were sold (of which Amulet - 10,119, Tiggo - 4,986, Fora - 2,596, QQ - 825, Oriental Son - 32), allowing Chery to take 12th place in the overall ranking in terms of sales in Russia. In 2007, in Russia, it sold 37,120 Chery cars. The factory produced 40,000 Chery cars that same year from semi-knocked-down kits.

In March 2008, Avtotor stopped assembling cars for Chery. The main cause being the fear that the government would deprive the factory of its privileges enjoyed under the Special Economic Zone, such as duty-free import of components.

General Motors 
In August 2003, Avtotor and General Motors signed a set of agreements on the organization of production of GM vehicles at the Kaliningrad plant.

In August 2004, the Kaliningrad plant started production of the Chevrolet TrailBlazer and Chevrolet Tahoe, and in October 2004, of the Hummer H2.

In July 2005, the Cadillac CTS, SRX and STS joined them.

On 21 November 2008, production of the Chevrolet Lacetti began in full cycle, including welding and painting. This investment in the organization of the production on the part of GM in Avtotor amounted to 80 million euros.

The other models produced at the Kaliningrad plant included the Cadillac Escalade, the Chevrolet Aveo, Epica, Malibu, Orlando, Captiva, and the Opel Astra, Zafira, Meriva, Insignia, Mokka, and Antara.

Since the existence of the project, Avtotor has produced over 362,000 cars for GM's brands. General Motors discontinued its partnership with Avtotor in 2015, citing poor economic outlook in the country.

Awards and recognition 

 In 2006, Avtotor was ranked 69th in Forbes magazine's list of the 200 largest private companies in Russia

Controversy 

 In 2012, Avtotor formed a partnership with Magna International, a Canadian auto-parts company. Vladimir Shcherbakov released a statement that the Canadian government had pressured Magna International into ending the partnership. A spokesperson for Magna denied the allegations.

References

External links 

Car manufacturers of Russia
Vehicle manufacturing companies established in 1996
Companies based in Kaliningrad
Contract vehicle manufacturers